Willcox is a city in Cochise County, Arizona, United States. The city is located in the Sulphur Springs Valley, a flat and sparsely populated drainage basin dotted with seasonal lakes. The city is surrounded by Arizona's most prominent mountain ranges, including the Pinaleño Mountains and the Chiricahua Mountains.

Six of Arizona's ten largest mountains are located within a 70-mile radius including Mount Graham (31 miles north), which is Arizona's most prominent mountain, Chiricahua Peak (42 miles southeast), Mount Lemmon (57 miles west), Miller Peak (65 miles southwest), Mica Mountain (41 miles west), and Mount Wrightson (70 miles southwest). Scores of birds, including sandhill cranes, winter in the area, with some migrating from as far away as Siberia. A very large dry lakebed, the Willcox Playa, is located five miles south of the city. It is the remnant of the Ice Age-era Lake Cochise.

Willcox's high desert climate gives it large diurnal temperature variation, making it ideal for wine cultivation.

History
Originally known as "Maley", the town was founded in 1880 as a whistlestop on the Southern Pacific Railroad because of its position approximately halfway between El Paso, Texas and Phoenix, Arizona. It was renamed in honor of a visit by General Orlando B. Willcox in 1889. In the early 20th century, Willcox was a national leader in cattle production. Agriculture remains important to the local economy, but Interstate 10 has replaced the railroad as the major transportation link, and much of the economy is now tied to the highway, which runs immediately north of the town.

Willcox is the birthplace of Rex Allen, known as "The Arizona Cowboy", who wrote and recorded many songs, starred in several Westerns during the early 1950s and in the syndicated television series Frontier Doctor (1958–1959). Parts of the 1993 American neo-noir film  Red Rock West starring Nicolas Cage, Lara Flynn Boyle, J. T. Walsh and Dennis Hopper were filmed in Willcox. A short film documentary called "Lonesome Willcox" released in 2018 documented the town's country music radio station KHIL.

Willcox became Arizona's second federally designated wine growing region in 2016.

Geography
Willcox is located in northern Cochise County, in the Sulphur Springs Valley.

Notable Mountains

Climate

Willcox's high elevation gives it a milder climate than the nearby Valley of the Sun and Sonoran Desert. It also receives more rainfall than Tucson and Phoenix due to the summer monsoon rains and thus it has a hot semi-arid climate (Koppen: BSh)

Economy
Willcox's primary industries are agriculture, wine production, and tourism.

Major employers in Willcox include Riverview LLP, NatureSweet greenhouse, Northern Cochise Community Hospital, Valley Telephone Cooperative, the Border Patrol, Safeway, Willcox Unified School District, and TravelCenters of America,

The wine industry employs over 400 people in the region. The agricultural producers in the area employ many hundreds of workers as well. Circle K and Speedway employ around thirty people as well.

Wine country
The Willcox wine region produces 74 percent of the wine grapes grown in the state of Arizona. Willcox is the largest-grape growing region in Arizona and grows more wine grapes than any other region in the state and offers a wide variety of wines to choose from. Grape varietals grown include Petite Sirah, Malvasia Bianca, Sangiovese, Chenin blanc, Syrah, Colombard, Sauvignon blanc, Corvina, Merlot, Malbec, Tannat, Cabernet Franc, Chardonnay, Tempranillo, Cabernet Sauvignon and Mourvèdre.

Arts, events, culture
Willcox has two festival seasons in the spring and fall.

Spring events include the Willcox Wine Country Spring Festival, which takes place the third weekend of May, and the Willcox West Fest in April.

Fall events include Rex Allen Days, which is a multi-day event that takes place the first weekend in October, the Willcox Wine Country Fall Festival, which takes place the 3rd weekend of October, the Willcox Flyer Bike Ride, which takes place the first Saturday of September, and the BoulderDash 13k/30k, which takes place in mid-October.

Winter festivals include the Christmas Light Parade and Craft Fair in December, and Wings Over Willcox Birding Festival which takes place over Martin Luther King Jr. Weekend.

Rex Allen Days was started in 1951 to honor Rex Allen. The event includes the annual parade, rodeos, fairs, car show and more.

Willcox Wine Country's two festivals are usually the third weekends of May and October. The event grows in size every year and includes live music and multiple arts and crafts vendors. Willcox Wine Festivals is listed as one of the top 10 wine festivals in North America.

Willcox West Fest celebrates Willcox's cowboy culture which is still active today through generations of ranching families. The event consists of a rodeo and a chuck wagon cook-off and usually occurs in April.

Demographics

As of the census of 2000, there were 3,733 people, 1,383 households, and 947 families residing in the city. The racial makeup of the city was 75.0% White, 0.7% Black or African American, 1.6% Native American, 0.8% Asian, 0.1% Pacific Islander, 17.6% from other races, and 4.2% from two or more races.  41.7% of the population were Hispanic or Latino of any race. The median income for a household in the city was $24,334. 21.6% of families and 27.0% of the population were below the poverty line, including 36.6% of those under age 18 and 24.6% of those age 65 or over.

Seventeen miles north of Willcox on what was once the York ranch, there are now miles of apple orchards and pistachio groves.

Media
KHIL "Classic Country" 1250 AM and 98.1 FM has served the region since 1958. The Herald has listings and news for all of Cochise county including Willcox.

Further reading
Vernon B. Schultz, "Southwestern Town: The Story of Willcox, Arizona," The University of Arizona Press, 1964

Kathy Klump and Peta-Anne Tenney, "Willcox," Arcadia Publishing Library Editions, 2009

People 
 Rex Allen (1920–1999), film and television actor, singer and songwriter
 Warren Earp (1855-1900), youngest of the Earp brothers, buried here. 
 Lilly McElroy (born 1980), photographer
 Chalky Wright (1912–1957), boxing champion in International Boxing Hall of Fame
 Tanya Tucker (born 1958), American country music artist, spent early childhood in Willcox, AZ
 Ted DiBiase (born 1954), American former professional wrestler, manager, ordained minister and color commentator, moved to Willcox, Arizona to live with his grandparents
 Vince Moreno, American country music artist and musician and stand-up comedian

See also 
 Rex Allen Arizona Cowboy Museum and Willcox Cowboy Hall of Fame

References

External links

 City of Willcox official website 
 Arizona Range News – newspaper
 Arizona Range News Archives
 Willcox, AZ Pinterest

 
Cities in Cochise County, Arizona
Cities in Arizona
Populated places established in 1880
1880 establishments in Arizona Territory